Kennedy Simon (born 1 October 1996) is a New Zealand rugby union player. She is a loose forward and plays for the Black Ferns internationally and was a member of their 2021 Rugby World Cup champion squad. She also plays for Chiefs Manawa in the Super Rugby Aupiki competition and represents Waikato provincially.

Rugby career

2013 & 2019 
Simon made her provincial debut for Waikato in 2013 against Otago Spirit. She made her test debut for the New Zealand women's national side, the Black Ferns, against the United States in 2019.

2020 
In 2020, Simon was awarded the international and Farah Palmer Cup player of the year by the New Zealand Rugby Players' Association at the New Zealand Rugby awards.

2021 
Simon was part of the inaugural Chiefs Manawa side that played in the first women's Super Rugby match in New Zealand at Eden Park in 2021.

2022 
Simon was named in the Black Ferns squad for the August test series against the Wallaroos for the Laurie O'Reilly Cup. She made the Black Ferns 32-player squad for the 2021 Rugby World Cup.

References

External links 
 Black Ferns Profile
 Chiefs Profile

Living people
New Zealand women's international rugby union players
New Zealand female rugby union players
1996 births